Luigi Vercelli (1898 – 1972) was an Italian footballer who played as a defender. On 6 November 1921, he represented the Italy national football team on the occasion of a friendly match against Switzerland in a 1–1 away draw.

Honours

Player
Novese
Italian Football Championship: 1921–22

References

1898 births
1972 deaths
Italian footballers
Italy international footballers
Association football defenders
U.S. Alessandria Calcio 1912 players
U.S.D. Novese players
S.P.A.L. players
A.C. Reggiana 1919 players